Marnham is a civil parish in the Bassetlaw district, in the county of Nottinghamshire, England. The parish includes the village of Low Marnham and the hamlets of High Marnham and Skegby. In 2011 the parish had a population of 117. The parish lies in the north east of the county, and south east within the district. It is 122 miles north of London, 23 miles north east of the city of Nottingham, and 17 miles north east of the market town of Mansfield. The parish touches Fledborough, Normanton on Trent, South Clifton, Tuxford and Weston. Marnham shares a parish council with Normanton on Trent. There are 7 listed buildings in Marnham.

Toponymy 
The name "Marnham" means 'Mearna's homestead/village', although little knowledge on this owner exists.

Geography

Location 
It is surrounded by the following local areas:

 Darlton and Fledborough to the north
 Normanton-on-Trent to the south
 South Clifton to the east
 Tuxford to the west.
The parish is approximately 4 miles in width, by 2 miles.

Settlements 
The parish consists of:

 Low Marnham
 High Marnham
 Skegby

Low Marnham 

This lies in the southeast corner of the parish, along a lane that spurs off a key road from Rampton to Sutton-on-Trent running north to south, near the River Trent. Low Marnham traditionally had the higher profile in the past because of its now dormant parish church and school/village hall. Very few public facilities exist.

High Marnham 

This is approximately of equal size to, and is further along the lane into Low Marnham. The lane runs nearby the River Trent before looping back to the Sutton-Rampton road. High Marnham presently maintains more amenities such as a public house, caravan site and park homes, but became prominent with the presence of the former ferry to South Clifton across the River Trent, and particularly with High Marnham power station being sited close to the village.

Skegby 

This is a small hamlet centrally located within the centre south of the parish. It is reached from the Marnham villages, without exiting the parish, by means of Polly Taylor's Road. It maintains very few houses with a number of farms in the surrounding area. A notable residence in the area is Skegby Manor which is a listed building.

Landscape 
Predominantly, many of the parish residents are clustered around the three villages. Outside of this is a light scattering of farms, farmhouses, auxiliary buildings and cottages amongst a wider mainly farmland setting. There are open fields to the west and north, and river floodplain areas (Ferry Holme, Marnham Holme, Marnham Meadow) to the east alongside the river.

Water features 

The Trent until the 19th century occasionally changed its course and one of these is called Old Trent, it brought the river much closer to the villages. Old Trent remains presently as a small stream.

There is a fishing lake at a caravan site along the unnamed road between the Marnham villages.

Land elevation 
A  shallow ridge by Polly Taylor's Road is known locally as Polly Taylor's Hill.

Governance and demography 
The three settlements are Low Marnham, High Marnham and Skegby.

These are combined as Marnham parish for administrative identity.

This parish reports a population of 117 residents.

It is managed at the first level of public administration by Marnham with Normanton-on-Trent Parish Council.

At district level, the wider area is managed by Bassetlaw District Council.

Nottinghamshire County Council provides the highest level strategic services locally.

History

Medieval history 
Roger de Busli at the time of the Domesday (1086) was the key landowner of the Marnham manor as well as beyond. From this, William de Kewles became lord of these manors, and from this they passed to the Chaworths. Elizabeth, the daughter and heiress of Sir George Chaworth, carried the holdings through marriage to Sir William Cope. By 1853 Earl Brownlow was the principal owner and Lord of the Manor of Marnham.

Church of England protestants 
Low Marnham has a notable connection to the early 17th century protestant movement and the ‘Mayflower Trail’ which usually tracks the development of Puritanism from Babworth to Scrooby and Austerfield. The ‘Mayflower’ route particularly begins here, because it is where the spiritual leader of the Scrooby separatists, Richard Clyfton started in his first capacity as vicar briefly in 1586, before taking up the post at Babworth only a few months after. It is also where John Smyth, the first Baptist, was involved in a riot, possibly to help gain control of the chapel from Puritans, and taken to court in 1604.

Marnham Hall 
Marnham Hall comprised a large manor house, Grade II listed, set within large grounds and located close to the River Trent at High Marnham. The oldest part of the hall dates to the 16th century, with remodelling and re-facing in the early 18th century. it was the home of the Cartwright family who had 'made good' through a family connection to Thomas Cranmer.  For 250 years they were the dominant family here and their memorials carpet the sanctuary floor in the Low Marnham church.

They are most famous for the 'golden generation' born in the mid-1700s where three brothers became quite notable. There was the explorer 'Labrador' George Cartwright who brought a small group of Inuit to stay at Marnham although most died of smallpox soon after. He and his brother John Cartwright or 'Jack' explored in Newfoundland alongside George and have a town (Cartwright) bearing their name - and a memorial. George ran out of money and the Hall had to be bought back from the mortgage by the younger brother John. He further tried to help out his brother Edmund, a clergyman who invented the power loom in 1784 but who then got into difficulties trying to run a textiles business. The 'Revolution Mill' they set up in Retford was not a success. Edmund lived in Low Marnham until the end of the 18th century, and later built Ossington Hall.

Edmund was also the father of the famous 'Mrs Markham', children's writer Elizabeth Penrose. He created other inventions such as the wool-combing machine, and was also vicar of Marnham in the 1770s. Jack sold Marnham to the Brownlows and moved to Lincolnshire, after which there was refurbishment involving part of the hall being demolished and rebuilt around 1789-1793. The Brownlows seat was Belton House in Lincolnshire, and so Marnham was let to tenant farmers. The estate remained in the Brownlow/Cust family until the death of the 3rd Earl in 1921, although there were sales of portions of the Marnham area from 1920.

Later history 
Earl Brownlow built a schoolhouse opposite the church at Low Marnham in 1823. This was latterly used as a church, before becoming a village hall.

Skegby Manor was a 285 acre farm. It was held by Charles Francis Wade in the mid 1800s. Their son Richard Wade became a partner in the Sharpe & Wade solicitor firm based in Market Deeping for many years, and run by several  generations of the Wade family. He was also Lord of the Manor in Skegby in 1927, with the manor let out to tenant farmers.

In 1835, White's Directory reported 3 farm houses and three cottages in Skegby.

Until 1866, Grassthorpe was a township within Marnham parish.

By the late 19th century the Marnham villages carried alternative names - Ferry or Upper (High) Marnham, and Church or Lower (Low) Marnham 

The ferry service, in place for many centuries between Marnham and South Clifton was in use until the early 20th century.

Part of Marnham parish was transferred to South Clifton on 25 March 1885 and on 1 April 1935. 137 acres was transferred from Normanton on Trent to Marnham, the transferred area had a population of 2 in 1931.

High Marnham power station 

The plant was commissioned in 1958, officially opened in October 1962, and closed in 2003 after 45 years of operation. An electrical substation remains in operation on site.

Economy 
Primarily, agriculture is the core usage of the local land within the parish.

JG Pears is an animal feed and fertiliser manufacturing facility, located to the south of Low Marnham.

There are three caravan and park home sites, mainly sited around High Marnham.

Community & leisure 

A village hall/church room is at Low Marnham.

There is one public house, The Brownlow Arms, in High Marnham.

Caravan parks and park homes are also located in and around High Marnham.

National Cycle route 647 runs along the north of the parish.

A boat club is run from the river at High Marnham.

Landmarks

Listed buildings 
There are 7 listed buildings, including:

 St Wilfrid's Church at Low Marnham, Grade I
 Marnham Hall at High Marnham, Grade II, portions of which date from the 16th century, but substantially from the 18th century.
 Village hall at Low Marnham, Grade II. This was first a school before becoming a parish church.
 Skegby Manor, Grade II, dates from the 18th century, possibly as early as 1720.

Transport 

The Lancashire, Derbyshire and East Coast Railway, and later LNER railway line ran through the heart of the parish, before exiting by Fledborough station which was along the north border at Fledborough Road. Fledborough was opened in 1897 and closed in 1955. The line continued to be used for through traffic until 1980, when the route over the River Trent/Fledborough viaduct was permanently closed off after a derailment. Coal traffic continued to Marnham until 2003 when the High Marnham power station was decommissioned.

The line west of the power station was reopened in 2009 as the High Marnham test track.

The trackbed east of the railway station location, which runs over the Fledborough viaduct as National Cycle route 647, is joined within Marnham parish.

Religious sites 

St Wilfrid's Church at Low Marnham dates from the 13th century, and was closed as a site of worship in 1986. Inside the church is a World War I memorial and a decorative entry door.

Notable people 
 George Cartwright (1739–1819), explorer
 John 'Jack' Cartwright (1740–1824), political reformer and naval officer
 Edmund Cartwright (1743–1823), inventor and clergyman

References

External links 
 Normanton-on-Trent with Marnham Parish Council

Civil parishes in Nottinghamshire
Bassetlaw District